Cepora kotakii is a butterfly in the family Pieridae. It is found on Simeulue Island.

References
  (1989). A new species and four new subspecies of Indonesian butterflies (Pieridae, Papilionidae, Nymphalidae). Futao 2:3-9.

Pierini
Butterflies described in 1989